The Albanian Congress of Trieste was a congress of Albanians held in Trieste, Austria-Hungary in the period between 27 February – 6 March 1913, organized by Faik Konica and Sotir Kolea with strong support from the Austrian authorities.

Developments

The Provisional Government of Albania sent Kristo Meksi as its emissary to the Albanian Congress of Trieste. Baron Franz Nopcsa who participated in the work of the congress, published his notes on the congress that became of particular historical interest. The participants of the congress included Fan Noli, Albert Ghica, Baron Juan Pedro Aladro Kastriota, Nikolla Ivanaj, Giuseppe Schirò, and Terenzio Tocci. All Albanian colonies sent their delegates, they came from US, Romania, Bulgaria, Egypt, Italy, and Trieste. The Arbëreshë community also was present, bringing with Marchese D'Auletta and his sons.
Hil Mosi was elected Chairman of the Congress, Faik Konitza and Dervish Hima as vice-chairmen, Fazil Toptani and Pandeli Evangjeli as secretaries. Marchese d'Auletta, one of the main candidates for the Albanian throne, was elected "Honorary President" of the congress.

The congress recognized the provisional government set up by Ismail Qemal bey Vlora and discussed the various candidates for the vacant throne. Among the candidates being discussed at the time were Ferdinand François Bourbon Orléans-Montpensier of France, Albert Ghika of Romania, Wilhelm Karl, Duke of Urach from Württemberg, the Egyptian prince Ahmed Fuad, and the Spanish nobleman Juan Pedro Aladro Kastriota descent from the Kastrioti family through his paternal grandmother, he was the son of the Marchese Castriota (D'Auletta) from Naples. Baron Nopzsa also proposed himself for the throne. Austria-Hungary promoted the congress, in particular to ensure the selection of a prince of its choice.

The situation of the Aromanians in Albania was also discussed. In particular, the Aromanians demanded the establishment of an autonomous canton within Albania. It had also been proposed in the simulatenous London Conference of 1912–1913 that all lands inhabited by the Aromanians in the Balkans be given to Albania to protect them from Greek and Serbian assimilation. However, this did not happen, and the Aromanians were not given an autonomous canton in Albania as they did not live in compact areas within this unenlarged Albanian state.

List of delegates

Decisions 
The program of the congress had four points:
 Preparing the request to be sent to the Great Powers for recognition of the political and economical independence of the Albania
 Treaty of friendship and support of the Aromanian populations that lived near Albanian-inhabited regions and wanted to be included in the Albanian state.
 Borders of future Albania
 Discussion about the prince

References

External links 
 Baron Franz Nopcsa and his contribution to Albanian studies, by Robert Elsie
 The Congress of Trieste, by Baron Franz Nopcsa with prologue of Robert Elsie
 The text about the Albanian Congress of Trieste, published on website Shipkovica, contains a list of the congress participants, (archived)
 The text about the congress published on Albplanet.de.tl website, written by Vitore Stefa – Leka

1913 conferences
1913 in Albania
History of the Aromanians
Aromanians in Albania
 1913